Harrods Limited is a department store located on Brompton Road in Knightsbridge, London, England. It is currently owned by the state of Qatar via its sovereign wealth fund, the Qatar Investment Authority. The Harrods brand also applies to other enterprises undertaken by the Harrods group of companies, including Harrods Estates, Harrods Aviation and Air Harrods.

The store occupies a  site and has 330 departments covering  of retail space. It is one of the largest and most famous department stores in the world.

The Harrods motto is Omnia Omnibus Ubique, which is Latin for "all things for all people, everywhere". Several of its departments, including the Seasonal Christmas department and the Food Halls, are well known.

Harrods was also a founder of the International Association of Department Stores in 1928, which is still active today, and remained a member until 1935. Franck Chitham, Harrods' president at the time, was president of the Association in 1930.

History

In 1824, at the age of 25, Charles Henry Harrod established a business at 228 Borough High Street in Southwark. He ran this business, variously listed as a draper, mercer, and a haberdasher, until at least 1831. During 1825, the business was listed as 'Harrod and Wicking, Linen Drapers, Retail', but this partnership was dissolved at the end of that year. His first grocery business appears to be as 'Harrod & Co. Grocers' at 163 Upper Whitecross Street, Clerkenwell, E.C.1., in 1832.

In 1834, in London's East End, he established a wholesale grocery in Stepney at 4 Cable Street with a special interest in tea. In 1849, to escape the vice of the inner city and to capitalise on trade to the Great Exhibition of 1851 in nearby Hyde Park, Harrod took over a small shop in the district of Brompton, on the site of the current store. Beginning in a single room employing two assistants and a messenger boy, Harrod's son Charles Digby Harrod built the business into a thriving retail operation selling medicines, perfumes, stationery, fruits and vegetables. Harrods rapidly expanded, acquired the adjoining buildings, and employed one hundred people by 1881.

However, the store's booming fortunes were reversed in early December 1883, when it burnt to the ground. Remarkably, Charles Harrod fulfilled all of his commitments to his customers to make Christmas deliveries that year—and made a record profit in the process. In short order, a new building was built on the same site, and soon Harrods extended credit for the first time to its best customers, among them Oscar Wilde, Lillie Langtry, Ellen Terry, Charlie Chaplin, Noël Coward, Gertrude Lawrence, Laurence Olivier and Vivien Leigh, Sigmund Freud, A. A. Milne, and many members of the British Royal Family. In 1921, Milne bought the 18-inch Alpha Farnell teddy bear from the store for his son Christopher Robin Milne who would name it Edward, then Winnie, becoming the basis for Winnie-the-Pooh.

A chance meeting in London with businessman, Edgar Cohen, eventually led to Charles Harrod selling his interest in the store for £120,000 via a stock market flotation in 1889. The new company was called Harrod's Stores Limited. Sir Alfred James Newton became chairman and Richard Burbidge managing director.  Financier William Mendel was appointed to the board in 1891 and he raised funding for many of the business expansion plans. Richard Burbidge was succeed in 1917 by his son Woodman Burbidge and he in turn by his son Richard in 1935.

On 16 November 1898, Harrods debuted England's first "moving staircase" (escalator) in their Brompton Road stores; the device was actually a woven leather conveyor belt-like unit with a mahogany and "silver plate-glass" balustrade. Nervous customers were offered brandy at the top to revive them after their 'ordeal'.

The department store was acquired by House of Fraser in 1959, which in turn was purchased by the Fayed brothers in 1985. In 1994, Harrods was moved out of the House of Fraser Group to remain a private company prior to the group's relisting on the London Stock Exchange.

Qatar Holdings ownership

Following denial that it was for sale, Harrods was sold to Qatar Holdings, the sovereign wealth fund of the State of Qatar in May 2010. A fortnight previously, chairman of Harrods since 1985, Mohamed Al-Fayed, had stated that "People approach us from Kuwait, Saudi Arabia, Qatar. Fair enough. But I put two fingers up to them. It is not for sale. This is not Marks and Spencer or Sainsbury's. It is a special place that gives people pleasure. There is only one Mecca."

The sale was concluded in the early hours of 8 May, when Qatari Prime Minister Hamad bin Jassim bin Jaber Al Thani came to London to finalise the deal, saying that the acquisition of Harrods would add "much value" to the investment portfolio of Qatar Holdings while his deputy, Hussain Ali Al-Abdulla, called it a "landmark transaction". A spokesman for Mohamed Al-Fayed said "in reaching the decision to retire, [Fayed] wished to ensure that the legacy and traditions that he has built up in Harrods would be continued."

Al-Fayed later revealed in an interview that he decided to sell Harrods following the difficulty in getting his dividend approved by the trustee of the Harrods pension fund. Al-Fayed said "I'm here every day, I can't take my profit because I have to take a permission of those bloody idiots. I say is this right? Is this logic? Somebody like me? I run a business and I need to take the trustee's permission to take my profit." Al-Fayed was appointed honorary chairman of Harrods, a position he held for six months.

With the previously operating Disney Cafe and Disney Store, the Disney at Harrods partnership added the Bibbidi Bobbidi Boutique salon on 25 November 2013 to those stores.

Significant event timeline

1824: Charles Henry Harrod starts his first business as a draper, at 228, Borough High Street, Southwark, London.
1834: Charles Henry Harrod (1799–1885) founds a wholesale grocery in Stepney, East London
1849: Harrods moves to the Knightsbridge area of London, near Hyde Park
1861: Harrods undergoes a transformation when it was taken over by Harrod's son, Charles Digby Harrod (1841–1905)
1883: On 6 December, fire guts the shop buildings, giving the family the opportunity to rebuild on a grander scale
1889: Charles Digby Harrod retires, and Harrods shares are floated on the London Stock Exchange under the name Harrod's Stores Limited
1905: Begun in 1894, the present building is completed to the design of architect Charles William Stephens.
1914: Harrods opened its first and only foreign branch in Buenos Aires, Argentina. It became independent of the British shop in the late 1940s, but continued to trade  under the Harrods name, for many years the only Harrods outside Britain.
1914: Harrods buys the Regent Street department store Dickins & Jones.
1914: Harrods Furniture Depository built in Barnes, near Hammersmith Bridge.
1919: Harrods buys the Manchester department store, Kendals; it took on the Harrods name for a short time in the 1920s, but the name was changed back to Kendals following protests from staff and customers.
1920: Harrods buys London department store Swan & Edgar and Manchester retailer Walter Carter Ltd.
1923: Mah-Jongg (lemur) was sold to Stephen Courtauld and Virginia Courtauld (née Peirano). Mah-Jongg lived with the Courtaulds for fifteen years, accompanying the couple on their travels and changes of residence, including Eltham Palace in the Royal Borough of Greenwich.
1928: Harrods buys London department store D H Evans.
1946: Harrods buys the Sheffield department store John Walsh.
1949: Harrods buys William Henderson & Co, a Liverpool department store.
1955: Harrods buys Birmingham department store Rackhams.
1959: The British department store holding company House of Fraser buys Harrods, fighting off competition from Debenhams and United Drapery Stores.
1969: Christian the lion was bought at Harrods by John Rendall and Anthony 'Ace' Bourke. The lion was set free in Kenya after reaching maturity.
1983: A terrorist attack by the Provisional IRA outside the Brompton store kills six people.
1986: The small town of Otorohanga in New Zealand briefly changes its name to Harrodsville in response to legal threats made by Mohamed Al-Fayed against a person with the surname of Harrod, who had used the name "Harrod's" for his shop.
1990: A Harrods shop opens on board the RMS Queen Mary in Long Beach, California, which was then owned by the Walt Disney Company. Harrods gives right to Duty Free International for a licence to operate a Harrods Signature Shop at Toronto Pearson International Airport's Terminal 3 (closed shortly after)
1993: An IRA terrorist attack injures four people.
1994: The relationship between House of Fraser and Harrods is severed. Harrods remains under the ownership of the Fayed family, and House of Fraser is floated on the stock exchange.
1997: An English court issued an injunction to restrain the Buenos Aires Harrods store from trading under the Harrods name, but the House of Lords in 1998 dismissed Fayed's lawsuit.
1998: The store on Buenos Aires closed after racking up large amounts of debt, there had been offers to buy the store from Falabella, El Corte Inglés, Printemps and more but Atilio Gilbertoni the owner of Harrods in Buenos Aires did not accept the offers as he wanted to keep the controlling stake in the brand
2000: A Harrods shop opens on board the Queen Elizabeth 2, owned by the Cunard Line.
2006: The Harrods "102" shop opens opposite the main shop in Brompton Road; it features concessions like Krispy Kreme and Yo! Sushi, as well as florists, a herbalist, a masseur, and an oxygen spa. The store closed in 2013.
2006: Omar Fayed, Mohamed's youngest son, joins the Harrods board.
2010: Fayed announces he has sold Harrods to the Qatar Investment Authority (QIA). It has been reported that the QIA paid  for the Knightsbridge store, in a deal signed in the early hours of 8 May 2010.
2010: Harrods looked at the possibility of expanding to China and opening a new shop in Shanghai. Michael Ward, managing director of Harrods, said, "There are other areas of the world where we could operate profitably." The number of Chinese shoppers visiting Harrods was increasing, and the average spent by a Chinese shopper was three times that of any other nationality.
2012: The figurative sculptures that once adorned the Harrods food hall are consigned for sale at West Middlesex Auction Rooms. The two Mermaids supporting a giant Clam and the Stag and Boar sheltering under an English Oak are purchased by Greaves & Thomas for inclusion in an elaborate fountain for Ryde, Isle of Wight.
2017: Harrods Bank is sold to Tandem and rebranded to Tandem Bank, Harrods Bank operated since 1893
2020: after lockdowns and restriction during the covid pandemic, Harrods made a loss of £68 million in 2020, reduced staff numbers, paid no dividend to its owners and said that no dividend was likely for another two years, and faced a strike by dozens of restaurant workers.

Products and services

The shop's 330 departments offer a wide range of products and services. Products on offer include clothing for women, men, children and infants, electronics, jewellery, sporting gear, bridal trousseau, pet accessories, toys (including Christmas and signature teddy bears), food and drink, health and beauty items, packaged gifts, stationery, housewares, home appliances, furniture, and much more.

A representative sample of shop services includes 23 restaurants, serving everything from high tea to tapas to pub food to haute cuisine; a personal shopping-assistance programme known as "By Appointment"; a watch repair service; a tailor; a dispensing pharmacy; a beauty spa and salon; a barbers shop; Ella Jade Bathroom Planning and Design Service; private events planning and catering; food delivery; a wine steward; bespoke picnic hampers and gift boxes; bespoke cakes; bespoke fragrance formulations; and Bespoke Arcades machines.

Up to 300,000 customers visit the shop on peak days, comprising the highest proportion of customers from non-English speaking countries of any department store in London. More than five thousand staff from over fifty different countries work at Harrods.

In October 2009, Harrods Bank started selling gold bars and coins that customers could buy "off the shelf". They also offered storage services, as well as the ability to sell back gold to Harrods in the future.

Harrods used to provide paid “luggage room” services for storing luggage/ items however post COVID they stopped providing this service.

Royal warrants
Harrods was the holder of royal warrants from:
Queen Elizabeth II (Provisions and Household Goods)
The Duke of Edinburgh (Outfitters)
The Prince of Wales (Outfitters and Saddlers)
Queen Elizabeth, the Queen Mother (China and Glass)

In August 2010, in a letter to The Daily Telegraph, chairman Mohamed Al-Fayed revealed that he had burnt Harrods royal warrants, after taking them down in 2000. Harrods had held the Royal warrants since 1910. Describing the warrants as a "curse", Al-Fayed claimed that business had tripled since their removal. The Duke of Edinburgh removed his warrant in January 2000, and the other warrants were removed from Harrods by Al-Fayed in December, pending their five-yearly review. The Duke of Edinburgh had been banned from Harrods by Al-Fayed. Film of the burning of the warrants in 2009 was shown in the final scene of Unlawful Killing, a film funded by Al-Fayed and directed by Keith Allen.

Memorials

Since the deaths of Diana, Princess of Wales, and Dodi Fayed, Mohamed Al-Fayed's son, two memorials commissioned by Al-Fayed have been erected inside Harrods to the couple. The first, located at the base of the Egyptian Escalator, was unveiled on 12 April 1998, consisting of photographs of the two behind a pyramid-shaped display that holds a wine glass smudged with lipstick from Diana's last dinner as well as what is described as an engagement ring Dodi purchased the day before they died.

The second memorial, unveiled in 2005 and located by the escalator at door three is entitled Innocent Victims, a bronze statue of the two dancing on a beach beneath the wings of an albatross, a bird said to symbolise the "Holy Spirit". The sculpture was created by William Mitchell, a close friend of Al-Fayed and artistic design advisor to Harrods for 40 years. Al-Fayed said he wanted to keep the pair's "spirit alive" through the statue.

After the death of Michael Jackson, Al-Fayed announced that they had already been discussing plans to build a memorial statue. This was unveiled in April 2011 at the rear of Craven Cottage football ground (Fulham F.C.) but removed in September 2013 on the orders of new club owner Shahid Khan.

Dress code
In 1989, Harrods introduced a dress code for customers. The store turns away people whose dress is not in compliance with the code. Forbidden items include cycling shorts; high-cut shorts, Bermuda or beach shorts; swimwear; athletic singlets; flip flops or thong sandals; bare feet; bare midriff; or wearing dirty or unkempt clothing. Patrons found not in compliance with the code and barred from entry include pop star Kylie Minogue, Jason Donovan, Luke Goss, a Scout troop, a woman with a Mohican hair cut, and the entire first team from FC Shakhtar Donetsk who were wearing tracksuits.

Size
The store occupies a  site and has over one million square feet of selling space in over 330 departments making it the biggest department store in Europe.

Criticism

Harrods and Mohamed Al-Fayed were criticised for selling real animal fur, provoking regular protests organised outside Harrods. Harrods is the only department store in Britain that has continued to sell fur. Harrods was sharply criticised in 2004 by the Hindu community for marketing a line of feminine underwear (designed by Roberto Cavalli) which featured the images of Indian goddesses. The line was eventually withdrawn and formal apologies were made.

Harrods has been criticised by Guardian journalist Sali Hughes as "deeply sexist" for making female employees wear six kinds of makeup at all times without requiring this of male employees. Harrods was criticised by members of the Black community after the Daily Telegraph reported that Harrods staff told a black woman that she would not be employed unless she chemically straightened her hair, stating that her natural hair style was "unprofessional".

Harrods' restaurants and cafes included a 12.5% discretionary service charge on customers' bills, but failed to share the full proceeds with kitchen and service staff. Several employees joined the UVW union, which claimed that 483 affected employees were losing up to £5,000 each in tips every year. A surprise protest and roadblock organised by the union outside Harrods during the January sales of 2017 was followed by an announcement that "an improved tronc system" would give 100% of service charges to staff.

Litigation
In 1986, the town of Otorohanga, New Zealand, briefly changed its name to "Harrodsville". This was a protest in support of a restaurateur, Henry Harrod of Palmerston North, who was being forced to change the name of his restaurant following the threat of lawsuits from Mohamed Al Fayed, the then owner of Harrods department store.  As a show of solidarity for Henry Harrod, and in anticipation of actions against other similar-sounding businesses, it was proposed that every business in Otorohanga change its name to "Harrods". With the support of the District Council, Otorohanga temporarily changed the town's name to Harrodsville.  After being lampooned in the British tabloids, Al Fayed dropped the legal action and Harrodsville and its shops reverted to their former names. The town's response raised widespread media interest around the world, with the BBC World Service and newspapers in Greece, Saudi Arabia, Australia and Canada covering the story.

On 27 October 2008, in the case of Harrods Ltd v. Harrods Limousine Ltd, the Harrods store applied to the Company Names Tribunal under s.69(1)(b) Companies Act 2006 for a change of name of Harrods Limousine Ltd, which had been registered at Companies House since 14 November 2007. The application went un-defended by the respondent and the adjudicator ordered on 16 January 2009 that Harrods Limousine Ltd must change their name within one month. Additionally the respondent was ordered not to cause or permit any steps to be taken to register another company with an offending name which could interfere, due to its similarity, with the goodwill of the applicant. Finally, Harrods Limousine Ltd was ordered to pay Harrods' costs for the litigation.

Controversy
Asma al-Assad, the wife of the President of Syria, Bashar al-Assad, used an alias to shop at Harrods despite economic sanctions imposed by the European Union that froze funds belonging to her and her husband.

See also

 Harrods Buenos Aires
 Fortnum & Mason
 Jenners, known as the "Harrods of the North"

References

Sources

Guinness World Records 2007, published by Guinness (8 August 2006),

Further reading

External links

Official website
 

 
Buildings and structures in the Royal Borough of Kensington and Chelsea
Harrods
Retail companies based in London
Companies formerly listed on the London Stock Exchange
Department stores of the United Kingdom
House of Fraser
Retail buildings in London
British Royal Warrant holders
Shops in London
Tourist attractions in the Royal Borough of Kensington and Chelsea
Department store buildings in the United Kingdom
1834 establishments in England
Knightsbridge
Food halls
Retail companies established in 1834
British companies established in 1834
Buildings by C. W. Stephens